is a railway station on the Ōu Main Line in the city of Fukushima, Fukushima Prefecture, Japan, operated by East Japan Railway Company (JR East).

Lines

Station layout
The station has a single island platform connected to the station building by a footbridge. The station is unattended.

Platforms

History
The station opened on 15 August 1919. It was absorbed into the JR East network upon the privatization of JNR on 1 April 1987.

Surrounding area

See also
 List of railway stations in Japan

References

External links

  

Railway stations in Fukushima Prefecture
Ōu Main Line
Stations of East Japan Railway Company
Railway stations in Japan opened in 1919
Fukushima (city)